Gilles Ouimet is a former Canadian politician, who was a Quebec Liberal Party member of the National Assembly of Quebec for the riding of Fabre.

First elected in the 2012 election, he announced his resignation from the legislature in August 2015.

References

Living people
Quebec Liberal Party MNAs
Politicians from Laval, Quebec
21st-century Canadian politicians
Year of birth missing (living people)